Hockridge is a surname. Notable people with the surname include:

 Derek Hockridge (1934–2013), British writer and translator
 Edmund Hockridge (1919–2009), Canadian baritone and actor